Orwell Township may refer to the following townships in the United States:

 Orwell Township, Otter Tail County, Minnesota
 Orwell Township, Ashtabula County, Ohio
 Orwell Township, Bradford County, Pennsylvania